Joubiniteuthis portieri, also known as Joubin's squid from the monotypic family Joubiniteuthidae and genus Joubiniteuthis. It is a rare, small squid which occurs in the mesopelagic to bathypelagic zones and which has a worldwide distribution in tropical and subtropical regions. It is a distinctive squid having long arms I-III which have numerous small suckers in six rows. Its biology is little known and it is thought that it stays in the depths of the ocean with its arms outstretched waiting for small animals to ensnare after they have accidentally swum into the arms.  This species is named after Louis Joubin, a French zoologist.  It is known to reach a mantle length of 9 cm.

References

External links

Tree of Life web project: Joubiniteuthis portieri

Squid
Molluscs described in 1916